John Preston Hings (22 November 1910 – September 1999) was an English cricketer. Hings was a right-handed batsman whose bowling style is unknown.  He was born at Leicester, Leicestershire.

Hings made two first-class appearances for Leicestershire in the 1934 County Championship against Nottinghamshire and Yorkshire.  In his two first-class appearances, Hings scored a total of 18 runs at an average of 4.50, with a high score of 10.

He died at Loughborough, Leicestershire, sometime in September 1999.  His father, John, Sr., played first-class cricket in South Africa.

References

External links
John Hings at ESPNcricinfo
John Hings at CricketArchive

1910 births
1999 deaths
Cricketers from Leicester
English cricketers
Leicestershire cricketers